Neoi Poroi is a coastal village of the Dio-Olympos municipality. Before the 2011 local government reform it was part of the municipality of East Olympos. The settlement of Neoi Poroi had a population of 733 inhabitants as of 2011. Neoi Poroi is a part of the community of Poroi. The main occupation in the village is tourism. A model development plan, has wide streets and squares.

Geography
The village is located on the southernmost coast of Pieria, near the traditional village of "Παλαιοί Πόροι", Paleoi Poroi and the vast and scenic wetlands in the northern part of Pineios.

Transport
The village is served by a railway station, with both Intercity trains and Proastiakos services to Thessaloniki.

Nearest places
Platamon, north
Beach of Panteleimon, north
Neos Panteleimonas, north 
Palios Panteleimonas, west
Beach of Skotina, north
Aigani, west
Kastri-Loutro, south
Nea Mesangala, south

See also
Castle of Platamon
List of settlements in the Pieria regional unit

References

Beaches of Greece
Populated places in Pieria (regional unit)
Tourist attractions in Central Macedonia
Landforms of Pieria (regional unit)
Landforms of Central Macedonia